Detlef Raugust (born 26 August 1954) is a German former footballer. He spent his entire career with 1. FC Magdeburg, and was part of their highly successful team of the 1970s.

Club career 
He played in more than 225 East German top-flight matches. In 1973-74 his club Magdeburg won the European Cup Winners' Cup. Raugust was on the pitch in the two semi-final matches and the decider against A.C. Milan.

International career 
Raugust made three appearances for the East Germany national football team.

References

External links
 
 
 

1954 births
Living people
German footballers
East German footballers
East Germany international footballers
1. FC Magdeburg players

Association football midfielders
Sportspeople from Magdeburg
People from Bezirk Magdeburg
DDR-Oberliga players